Louis Waldon (December 16, 1934 – December 6, 2013) was an American film actor, whose career spanned nearly 45 years. He was born in Modesto, California.

Waldon began his acting career in 1965. He was best known for his collaboration with American artist and film director Andy Warhol, and as one of the Warhol superstars, appeared in several of Warhol's films, including The Nude Restaurant (1967), Lonesome Cowboys (1968), Flesh (1968), and Blue Movie (1969), a seminal film in the Golden Age of Porn. He also appeared in a minor role in the film Mask (1985).

He was friends with fellow Andy Warhol actor Waldo Díaz-Balart.

Waldon died following a stroke on December 6, 2013, aged 78, in Los Angeles, California.

Selected filmography
 The Nude Restaurant (1967)
 Lonesome Cowboys (1968)
 Flesh (1968)
 Blue Movie (1969)
 Necropolis (1970)
  (1971, based on Georg Büchner's Lenz)
 Jaider, der einsame Jäger (1971)
 Vampira (1971, TV film)
 Pan (1973)
  (1973)
 Inki (1973)
 Mask (1985)

References

External links

1934 births
2013 deaths
People from Modesto, California
American male film actors
20th-century American male actors
21st-century American male actors
People associated with The Factory